The Fixing America's Surface Transportation Act or the FAST Act is a funding and authorization bill to govern United States federal surface transportation spending. It was passed by Congress on December 3, 2015, and President Barack Obama signed it on the following day. The vote was 359–65 in the House of Representatives and 83–16 in the United States Senate.

History
The bill was introduced to the House by Rodney Davis as the "Hire More Heroes Act of 2015" on January 6, 2015. The $305 billion, five-year bill is funded without increasing transportation user fees. (The federal gas tax was last raised in 1993.)  Instead, funds were generated through changes to passport rules, Federal Reserve Bank dividends, and privatized tax collection.

In Section 6021, Congress asked the Transportation Research Board (TRB) to conduct a study of the actions needed to upgrade and restore the Interstate Highway System to fulfill its role as a crucial national asset, serving the needs of people, cities and towns, businesses, and the military while remaining the safest highway network in the country. The subsequent 2019 report, "Renewing the National Commitment to the Interstate Highway System: A Foundation for the Future," recommended actions Congress could take.

Transportation provisions
The Act requires a reanalysis of the costs and benefits of electronically controlled pneumatic brakes.

Unrelated provisions

 This law authorizes the Export–Import Bank of the United States through 2019.
 New crop insurance funding is approved.
 Emigrant Savings Bank would have been exempted from certain provisions of the Dodd–Frank Wall Street Reform and Consumer Protection Act. This was not included in the final bill that was passed into law.
 The Act also includes several revisions to federal securities law, including Section 76001 of the Act.  This provision creates a new Section 4(a)(7) of the Securities Act of 1933, a new exemption from registration under that act intended to facilitate secondary trading of private company securities among accredited investors.  By doing so, Congress and the President hoped to support smaller, nonpublic companies with their capital raising efforts by providing more liquidity for their securities, with reduced regulatory burdens.

References

External links
 Fixing America’s Surface Transportation Act as amended (PDF/details) in the GPO Statute Compilations collection
 Fixing America’s Surface Transportation Act as enacted (PDF) in the US Statutes at Large

United States federal transportation legislation
Acts of the 114th United States Congress
2015 in American law